Clemente Rojas (born September 1, 1952 in Cartagena) is a retired boxer from Colombia, who won the bronze medal in the men's featherweight division (– 57 kilograms) at the 1972 Summer Olympics. He turned pro on September 29, 1974, and retired in 1983, after 25 bouts (nine wins, thirteen losses and three draws).

1972 Olympic results
Below is the record of Clemente Rojas, a Colombian featherweight boxer who competed at the 1972 Munich Olympics:

 Round of 64: bye
 Round of 32: defeated Dale Anderson (Canada) by decision, 3-2
 Round of 16: defeated Kuncho Kunchev (Bulgaria) by walkover
 Quarterfinal: defeated Antonio Rubio (Spain) by disqualification in the second round
 Semifinal: lost to Philip Waruinge (Kenya) by decision, 2-3 (was awarded bronze medal)

References
 

1952 births
Living people
Olympic boxers of Colombia
Olympic bronze medalists for Colombia
Boxers at the 1972 Summer Olympics
Sportspeople from Cartagena, Colombia
Olympic medalists in boxing
Colombian male boxers
Medalists at the 1972 Summer Olympics
Featherweight boxers
20th-century Colombian people
21st-century Colombian people